Arcipelago di La Maddalena National Park is a geomarine national park on the coast of Sardinia. The park was established on 1 April 1994, followed by the change of DPR on 17 May 1996. It covers an area on land and sea of over 12,000 hectares and 180 kilometers of coasts. This region includes all the islands and islets within the territory of the Municipality of La Maddalena, Italy. The territory of the National Park will also represent an important part of the Bocche di Bonifacio international marine park which will soon be established.

The Park's includes some beautiful beaches and these islands: La Maddalena, Caprera, Spargi and Spargiotto, Budelli, Razzoli e Santa Maria and the Isles of Nibani, Mortorio, Soffi e Camere.

As of mid 2020, the Park had a single private inhabitant. Mauro Morandi had lived in a former WW II shelter on Budelli island since 1989 and acted as an unofficial caretaker. He was to be evicted by the end of 2020.

In 2016, the park's president explained why Morandi could not continue to live in the park indefinitely. "[He] symbolizes a man, enchanted by the elements, who decides to devote his life to contemplation and custody ... "No one ignores [his] role in representing the historical memory of the place … But it's hard to find a contractual arrangement for a person in his position".   Morandi took up residence in an apartment in Maddalena and is working on writing his memoirs.

See also
 Maddalena archipelago

References

External links
Pages by the Park Authority on Parks.it

National parks of Italy
Parks in Sardinia
Protected areas established in 1994